The Dane gun was originally a type of long-barreled flintlock musket imported into West Africa by Dano-Norwegian traders prior to the mid-19th century. The term is now used chiefly by Europeans living along the west African coast to generally describe any indigenously made firearm of this type.

Local names for these firearms vary from language to language, but are generally something that "seem[s] to mean or imply a 'native gun'". They are produced in large numbers by local blacksmiths, and are used mostly for hunting game, replacing traditional weapons such as the bow and spear.

See also
 Danish West India Company
 Osu Castle
 Danish slave trade

References 

Danish Gold Coast
Muskets
Muzzleloaders
West African culture
Nigerian culture
Danish overseas colonies
African weapons
Firearms of Denmark
Firearms of Norway
Military of the Ashanti Empire
Military history of Denmark
Military history of Norway
Military history of Ghana